The Central Sequoia League is a high school athletic league that is part of the CIF Central Section.

The CSL made its debut in 2006, the original members included Coalinga, Dinuba, Kingsburg, Selma, Exeter, and Immanuel.

Central Valley Christian joined the league in 2008.

Coalinga and Immanuel left the league in 2012. Immanuel rejoined the league in 2016, Immanuel's football team left the league again in the year 2018 to become independent, Hanford West soon joined the league in 2018.

Members
 Central Valley Christian High School
 Immanuel High School
 Dinuba High School
 Kingsburg High School
 Exeter Union High School
 Selma High School
 Hanford West High School

References

CIF Central Section